The Battleground State Forest is a state forest located near Gould Township in Cass County, Minnesota. It is managed by the Minnesota Department of Natural Resources. It lies entirely within the boundaries of the Chippewa National Forest, additionally, and a portion of the forest falls within the borders of the Leech Lake Indian Reservation. 

Outdoor recreation activities include hiking and mountain biking on provided trails, as well as backcountry camping. Swimming  and fishing are an option on bordering Leech Lake, boating is possible due to the forest's two public access boat launches.

See also
List of Minnesota state forests

External links
Battleground State Forest - Minnesota Department of Natural Resources (DNR)

References

Minnesota state forests
Protected areas of Cass County, Minnesota
Protected areas established in 1963